Lady Day: The Complete Billie Holiday on Columbia 1933–1944 is a 10-CD box set compiling the complete known studio master recordings, plus alternate takes, of Billie Holiday during the time period indicated, released in 2001 on Columbia/Legacy, CXK 85470. Designed like an album of 78s, the medium in which these recordings initially appeared, the 10.5" × 12" box includes 230 tracks, a 116-page booklet with extensive photos, a song list, discography, essays by Michael Brooks, Gary Giddins, and Farah Jasmine Griffin, and an insert of appreciations for Holiday from a diversity of figures including Tony Bennett, Elvis Costello, Marianne Faithfull, B.B. King, Abbey Lincoln, Jill Scott, and Lucinda Williams. At the 44th Grammy Awards on February 27, 2002, the box set won the Grammy Award for Best Historical Album of the previous year.

History
These recordings were made in a time before the LP album, introduced by Columbia Records in 1948. Recorded music had arrived a few decades earlier in the form of a 10-inch gramophone record playing at 78 revolutions per minute, two songs of around three-and-a-half minute duration per side. During the Great Depression, record sales for domestic use dramatically decrease, but a viable market remained for the playing of records in jukeboxes. Initially, these records featuring Billie Holiday were made with that market in mind.

John Hammond, who had discovered Holiday singing in a Harlem jazz club in 1933, arranged for her first recording session that same year on November 27. In the company of Jack Teagarden, Gene Krupa, and Hammond's future brother-in-law Benny Goodman, the two sides with Holiday would be released under Goodman's name. A little more than 19 months later, Holiday would be in another New York studio for her second session in association with Goodman again, as well as Ben Webster and Cozy Cole, under the leadership of Teddy Wilson. From July 2, 1935, through August 7, 1941, Holiday would regularly record, for commercial issue, 78s credited to herself or to Wilson.

With a few exceptions, these records were originally released on labels other than Columbia which catered to an African American market, then referred to as race records. The labels Brunswick Records and Vocalion Records became fellow companies to Columbia when it was purchased in 1934 by the American Record Corporation, which had owned Brunswick and Vocalion since late 1931. Records credited to Wilson were released on Brunswick; those to Holiday on Vocalion. With the purchase of ARC in 1939 by CBS, the corporation re-organized its record labels under the aegis of Columbia as the parent company. Starting in 1940, the Holiday releases were issued on the Okeh Records imprint, reactivated by CBS to handle its product for the "race record" market.

Content
Discs one through six, and disc seven tracks one through fourteen present the master takes in chronological recorded order. The remainder of disc seven, and discs eight through ten, present the alternate takes and other items, also in chronological recorded order. The other items consist of eight tracks not part of the general body of Wilson/Holiday recordings from 1935 to 1941. The first, track 15 of disc seven "Saddest Tale" with the Duke Ellington Orchestra, was taken from the soundtrack to the  short film Symphony in Black released by Paramount in 1935. Disc eight, tracks three through five, contain airchecks with the Count Basie Orchestra from 1937, the only documentation of Holiday's year-long tenure as Basie's band singer. Disc nine, tracks seven and eight, feature recordings broadcast on the Camel Caravan radio variety program of January 17, 1939; with backing by the Benny Goodman Orchestra, Billie sings alongside Johnny Mercer, Martha Tilton, and Leo Watson on the second song, Mercer's "Jeepers Creepers".

The final two tracks of the set, numbers 22 and 23 of disc ten, are from the Esquire Award Winners Concert at the Metropolitan Opera, broadcast and recorded on V-Discs for distribution to servicemen overseas during World War II. Holiday had won top female jazz vocalist for 1943, and became the first African American woman to sing at the Met. "Do Nothing 'Til You Hear From Me" and "Billie's Blues," under a different title, are performed accompanied by other Esquire poll winners, Roy Eldridge, Barney Bigard, Art Tatum, Al Casey, Oscar Pettiford, and Sidney Catlett. This recording took place more than two years after the final studio session in 1941, and during the Petrillo recording ban; the AFM waived the strike terms for the recording of V-discs.

Original recording sessions took place at the following locations in New York City: at the 55 Fifth Avenue Studio on November 27, 1933; at the 1776 Broadway Studio from 1935 through January 1939; at the 711 Fifth Avenue Studio from March 1939 through June 1940; at Liederkranz Hall on East 58th Street in September and October 1940; and at Columbia Studios in their new headquarters at 799 Seventh Avenue in 1941. The producers for the original recordings included John Hammond and Bernie Hanighen, others are not known.

Significance
In terms of a collected body of work combining both influence and quality of achievement, these recordings are some of the most important in jazz history. Ranking jazz records always presents an exercise in both controversy and consternation, but certainly the Wilson/Holiday sides belong in the company of the Hot Five and Hot Sevens of Louis Armstrong, the collated set by Fletcher Henderson later called A Study In Frustration, the early Basie band on Decca, Duke Ellington's records with Ben Webster and Jimmy Blanton for RCA Victor, the Charlie Parker bebop sides for Savoy and Dial, and the Atlantic LPs by Ornette Coleman, not to mention the expanse of albums by Miles Davis and John Coltrane, together and separately.

The sessions coincide with the rise of the swing era on its way to becoming the popular music of the United States during the late Depression and war years. Chosen by Hammond, Hanighen, Holiday, or Wilson, many of the musicians present were members of the leading swing bands of the day, such as those by Ellington, Basie, Goodman, Artie Shaw, Jimmie Lunceford, and Cab Calloway, among others. Of special note are the records cut with members of the Basie band, Holiday herself hired by Basie in 1937, including his rhythm section of Freddie Green, Walter Page, and Jo Jones, along with key soloists Buck Clayton and Holiday's musical soul-mate, Lester Young. The roster of Holiday and Wilson sidemen reads like a who's who of jazz soloists from the 1930s.

As a singer, Holiday had influence on defining the style of a big band vocalist after that of Bing Crosby and her role model, Louis Armstrong. Her records appeared just as the swing era was getting underway; subsequently, singers such as Ella Fitzgerald, Frank Sinatra, Anita O'Day, and Peggy Lee, for instance, starting out respectively with the bands of Chick Webb, Tommy Dorsey, Gene Krupa, and Benny Goodman, all found inspiration in the Holiday records on Brunswick and Vocalion. Her manipulation of rhythm and length of musical phrases, allied to her ability to find emotional resonance in songs, was acknowledged publicly as a template by singers from her own era, Sinatra, Lee, Bennett, and others, and by myriad singers in later eras. As stated by Gary Giddins in the liner notes to the box set:
"When I first got to know ["A Sailboat in the Moonlight"], I thought it a fine melody with pretty chord changes and words that might be corny but didn't seem to be so bad when Lady Day delivered them. Then I chanced to find the sheet music at a Midwestern bazaar; at home, I picked out the melody with one finger and was astonished at how different it was from what Holiday sang. Until that moment, I had not fully gauged how freely imaginative her embellishments could be. By ironing out a phrase here, retarding another there, raising this note, slurring that, she transformed a hopelessly banal and predictable melody into something personal, real, meaningful."

That Sony would lavish such an expensive box for recordings originally designed for the inexpensive medium of jukebox play from six to seven decades previously stands as testament to the staying power of this body of work.

Select collective personnel
 Billie Holiday – vocal
 Teddy Wilson – piano
 Bobby Hackett — cornet
 Henry "Red" Allen, Bunny Berigan, Buck Clayton, Harry "Sweets" Edison, Roy Eldridge, Chris Griffin, Harry James, Jonah Jones, Hot Lips Page, Charlie Shavers, Cootie Williams — trumpet
 Benny Morton, Dicky Wells, Trummy Young — trombone
 Buster Bailey, Benny Goodman, Vido Musso, Artie Shaw — clarinet
 Edgar Sampson — clarinet, alto saxophone
 Tab Smith — soprano saxophone, alto saxophone
 Johnny Hodges, Don Redman — alto saxophone
 Benny Carter — alto saxophone, tenor saxophone
 Chu Berry, Don Byas, Herschel Evans, Babe Russin, Ben Webster — tenor saxophone
 Lester Young — tenor saxophone, clarinet
 Harry Carney — baritone saxophone, clarinet
 Margaret "Countess" Johnson, Billy Kyle, Joe Sullivan, Claude Thornhill, Sonny White — piano
 Dave Barbour, Al Casey, Freddie Green, Carmen Mastren, Dick McDonough, Allan Reuss — guitar
 Milt Hinton, John Kirby, Grachan Moncur, Walter Page – bass
 Kenny Clarke, Cozy Cole, J.C. Heard, Jo Jones, Gene Krupa — drums

Reissue personnel
 Michael Brooks – producer
 Michael Cuscuna – producer
 Steve Berkowitz – co-producer
 Seth Rothstein – co-producer
 Mark Wilder – digital remastering
 Seth Foster – digital remastering
 Phil Schaap – consultant
 Ron Jaramillo – art direction, design
 Adam Owett – art direction

Track listing
In the writer(s) column the lyricists are named first.

Disc one

Disc two

Disc three

Disc four

Disc five

Disc six

Disc seven

Disc eight

Disc nine

Disc ten

* live recordings

Charts

References

Billie Holiday albums
Albums produced by Michael Cuscuna
2001 compilation albums
Grammy Award for Best Historical Album
Vocal jazz compilation albums